Karl Nehammer (born 18 October 1972) is an Austrian politician who is the 32nd and current chancellor of Austria since 6 December 2021. A member of the Austrian People's Party (ÖVP), he previously was Minister of the Interior from 2020 to 2021, general secretary of the ÖVP from 2018 to 2020, as well as a member of the National Council from 2017 to 2020. Nehammer assumed the chancellorship as the successor of Alexander Schallenberg, who resigned to return as Minister of Foreign Affairs.

Early life and education
Nehammer grew up in Vienna, where he attended Kalksburg College and Amerlingstrasse Grammar School, graduating in 1992. He completed his military service as a one-year volunteer with further service until 1996. In 1997 he was discharged as a lieutenant. He then worked as an instructional trainer for information officers for the Federal Ministry of Defence and as a trainer for strategic communication for various institutions, such as the Vocational Promotion Institute (BFI) and the Political Academy of the Austrian People's Party. 

From 2012, Nehammer completed a two-year university course in political communication at the University for Continuing Education Krems and graduated with a master's degree. 

Nehammer is a member of the Catholic Austrian Students' Corporations Sonnberg Perchtoldsdorf within the Mittelschüler-Kartellverband.

Political career
Nehammer became active within the ÖVP party organisation after leaving the military, initially working with the party academy. He was then head of the service and mobilisation department at the party headquarters from 2007–08 and the training and networking department from 2008–09. He then became director of the party academy's Lower Austria association and was considered close to then-deputy governor Wolfgang Sobotka.

In October 2015, Nehammer was appointed deputy general-secretary and federal organizational speaker of the Austrian Workers' Union (ÖAAB), the trade union association of the ÖVP. During the 2016 Austrian presidential election, he was appointed replacement manager for the ÖVP's Andreas Khol partway through the campaign, but was unable to save him from a historically poor result of 11%.

He succeeded August Wöginger as general-secretary of the ÖAAB in 2016 and held this position until January 2018. In November 2016, he was also elected regional chairman of the ÖAAB Vienna. Since April 2017, he has been district party chairman of the ÖVP in Vienna-Hietzing.

In the 2017 federal election, Nehammer was elected as a representative for Vienna. During the subsequent government formation, he was a member of the ÖVP negotiating team in the area of defence. He was elected as deputy chairman of the ÖVP parliamentary faction on 8 November and was appointed media spokesman. On 25 January 2018, he succeeded Elisabeth Köstinger and Stefan Steiner as general-secretary of the ÖVP. In September 2018, he also succeeded Efgani Dönmez as spokesman for integration and migration.

Nehammer ran in the 2019 federal election in fifth place in the ÖVP Vienna state list, and eleventh place on the ÖVP federal list. He was also one of the ÖVP's five assessors at the electoral authority during the election. In the course of the subsequent government formation, he negotiated in the areas of Europe, migration, integration, and security.

Minister of the Interior
Nehammer was appointed minister of the interior in the second Kurz government, and was sworn in on 7 January. Under his leadership, the Austrian government filed charges in mid-2020 against a person who had confessed to spying for Turkey’s secret service. He was one of three public crisis managers during the COVID-19 pandemic, with responsibility for the enforcement of lockdowns and restrictions. He is considered a strong supporter of Sebastian Kurz's refugee policy.

Nehammer led the government response following the 2020 Vienna attack. He described the attacker as an "Islamist terrorist" and a sympathiser of the Islamic State, and admitted that intelligence services under his jurisdiction had failed to communicate information that could have prevented the attack. Nehammer's wife and children received police protection as a result of death threats received after the attack.

Chancellor of Austria

In October 2021, Sebastian Kurz resigned as chancellor in the wake of a corruption investigation and was succeeded by Foreign Minister Alexander Schallenberg. Kurz remained as leader of the ÖVP until 2 December, when he announced his retirement from politics. Soon afterward, Schallenberg announced he would not seek the leadership and would resign as chancellor in favour of the new ÖVP leader once one had been elected. On 3 December, Nehammer was provisionally appointed as leader of the ÖVP by the federal party committee and proposed as chancellor. He was sworn in by President Alexander Van der Bellen on 6 December. In an extraordinary party convention on 14 May 2022, Nehammer was elected ÖVP chairman by 100% of the votes.

Under Nehammer’s leadership, Austria’s government implemented a package of measures worth six billion euros ($6.3 billion) in 2022 aimed at cushioning the blow to households of the rising cost of living.
On 8 December 2022 he was the architect of blocking Romania and Bulgaria access in Schengen area.

Other activities
 National Fund of the Republic of Austria for Victims of National Socialism, Member of the Board of Trustees (since 2020)

Recognition
On February 22, 2022, Greek Minister of Migration & Asylum Notis Mitarachi awarded Karl Nehammer the Commendation Medal of First Class Migration Assistance in recognition of Nehammer’s contribution, as well as the Austrian Government’s, in managing the Evros’s migration crisis of March 2020.

Personal life
Nehammer is married to fellow ÖVP member Katharina Nehammer. They have two children. The couple received criticism in early 2020 after Katharina was appointed spokeswoman for the Ministry of Defence, with Herbert Kickl accusing the government of putting interior and defence policy "in the hands of one family". She began working in the private sector in public relations in July 2020. Nehammer's father-in-law is former ORF presenter Peter Nidetzky.

See also

 List of chancellors of Austria

References

External links

Karl Nehammer on the Austrian Parliament website

|-

Living people
1972 births
Anti-Bulgarian sentiment
Anti-Romanian sentiment
Austrian eurosceptics
Austrian Roman Catholics
Austrian conspiracy theorists
Government ministers of Austria
Interior ministers of Austria
Austrian People's Party politicians
Members of the National Council (Austria)
Politicians from Vienna
21st-century Austrian politicians
20th-century Austrian military personnel